The Court-Martial of Jackie Robinson is a 1990 American drama film directed by Larry Peerce and written by L. Travis Clark, Steve Duncan, Clay Frohman and Dennis Lynton Clark. The film stars Andre Braugher, Daniel Stern, Ruby Dee, Stan Shaw, Paul Dooley and Bruce Dern. The film premiered on TNT on October 15, 1990.

Plot

Cast 
Andre Braugher as Jackie Robinson
Daniel Stern as William Cline
Ruby Dee as Jackie's mother
Stan Shaw as Joe Louis
Paul Dooley as Willy Bailey
Bruce Dern as Scout Ed Higgins	
Kasi Lemmons as Rachel
J. A. Preston as Wendell Smith
Michael Greene	
Dale Dye	
Steven Williams as Satchel Paige
Noble Willingham	
Gary Grubbs 		
Don Hood as Maj. Foley
Howard French as Sgt. McEllroy
Jim Beaver as Maj. Trimble
Russell Curry as Mack at 21
Peter Parros as Gordon Jones
Nancy Cheryll Davis as Loretta Jones
Dale Swann as Dr. Smith
Glenn Morshower as Capt. Spencer
Brenda Ballard as Miss Wharton
Ken Kerman as Asch
Chris Kinkade as Cpl. Dwight

References

External links
 

1990 television films
1990 films
1990 drama films
American drama television films
Cultural depictions of Jackie Robinson
American films based on actual events
Films directed by Larry Peerce
Military courtroom films
TNT Network original films
1990s English-language films
1990s American films